Rachid Ben Ali (born 1978, Taza, Morocco) is a controversial Moroccan-Dutch painter.

Biography and work 
At the age of 15 he was sent by his parents to the Netherlands. He is an autodidact. Later he attended the Polytechnic of the Arts in Antwerp, Belgium. He lives and works in Amsterdam and London.

In 2001 and 2003 he had shows in the Tanya Rumpff Gallery in Haarlem, the Stedelijk Museum in Amsterdam and the Wereldmuseum in Rotterdam. Queen Beatrix chose one of his paintings to introduce an exposition in the Stedelijk Museum.

In 2003 he won the KunstRAI award for young artists, and in 2005 40 of his most recent paintings were shown at the Cobra Museum of Modern Art in Amstelveen, near Amsterdam.

His work has triggered anger and threats from Islamist militants in the Netherlands. He went into hiding after death threats related to an exhibit showing "hate-imams" spitting bombs. Since then, he has required bodyguards, the cost of which are paid for by the Cobra Museum.

References

External links 
 Rachid's own site
 Extensive information on R. Ben Ali, (Dutch)

1978 births
Dutch Muslims
Living people
People from Taza
Moroccan male painters
Dutch painters
Dutch male painters
Moroccan emigrants to the Netherlands
Moroccan contemporary artists
21st-century Moroccan painters